Bernardino de Cupis was an Italian Roman Catholic prelate who served as Bishop of Osimo (1551–1574).

Biography
On 24 Aug 1551, he was appointed during the papacy of Pope Julius III as Bishop of Osimo. He served as Bishop of Osimo until his resignation in 1574. 

While bishop, he was the principal co-consecrator of Angelo Cesi (bishop of Todi), Bishop of Todi (1566); and Girolamo Simoncelli, Bishop of Orvieto (1573).

References 

16th-century Italian Roman Catholic bishops
Bishops appointed by Pope Julius III